Saint-Arnac is a commune in the Pyrénées-Orientales department in southern France.

Geography 
Saint-Arnac is in the canton of La Vallée de l'Agly and in the arrondissement of Perpignan.

Toponymy 
Attested forms
The name of Saint-Arnac appears in 899 as villare Centernacho, followed by Centernacum in the 12th century. But already in 1137, Ermengaud de So gives the name Sent Ernach, which later becomes Sant Arnach or Sanctum Arnachum, and then Saint-Arnac or Saint-Arnach in French.

Etymology
The original name, Centernach, is probably that of a landowner, followed by the suffix -acum, which may be either :
 Centerinus (from Centenus) ;
 Cincturinus (from Cinctura) ;
 Centuriones (from centurion).

The mistake made in the 12th century by homonymy is a reference to a supposed saint Arnach, who never existed, although Arnac used to be a common German name at the time (from arn, eagle, followed by -acum).

Population

See also
Communes of the Pyrénées-Orientales department

References

Communes of Pyrénées-Orientales
Fenouillèdes